Johnson Kendrick Costa (27 January 1992 – 7 July 2017) was a Brazilian footballer who last played for Al-Gharafa.

Death
On 7 July 2017, Kendrick was shot in the face after a robbery attempt while on holiday in his native country. He was due to return to Qatar the following day.

References

External links
 

1992 births
2017 deaths
Brazilian footballers
Muaither SC players
Al-Gharafa SC players
Qatar Stars League players
Qatari Second Division players
Association football forwards
Brazilian expatriate footballers
Expatriate footballers in Qatar
Brazilian expatriate sportspeople in Qatar
Brazilian murder victims
Male murder victims
People murdered in Brazil
Deaths by firearm in Brazil